Benzamidine is the organic compound with the formula C6H5C(NH)NH2.  It is the simplest aryl amidine.  The compound is a white solid that is slightly soluble in water. It is usually handled as the hydrochloride salt, a white, water-soluble solid.

In terms of its molecular structure, Benzamidine features one short C=NH bond and one longer C-NH2 bond, respectively 129 and 135 picometers.

Applications
Benzamidine is a reversible competitive inhibitor of trypsin, trypsin-like enzymes and serine proteases.

It is often used as a ligand in protein crystallography to prevent proteases from degrading a protein of interest; the triangular diamine group at the bottom gives it a very obvious 'stick-man' shape which shows up in difference density maps.  The benzamidine moiety is also found in some pharmaceuticals, like dabigatran.

Condensation with various haloketones provides a synthetic route to 2,4-disubstituted imidazoles.

References

Phenyl compounds
Amidines